Lepidochrysops procera, the Potchefstroom blue, is a butterfly of the family Lycaenidae. It is found in South Africa, where it is known from KwaZulu-Natal midlands to Mpumalanga, Gauteng, Limpopo Province and North West.

The wingspan is 28–34 mm for males and 29–36 mm for females. Adults are on wing from September to November. There is one generation per year.

The larvae feed on Becium grandiflorum, Ocimum canum and Lippia scaberrima.

References

Butterflies described in 1893
procera
Endemic butterflies of South Africa